The men's 100 metre butterfly S9 event at the 2008 Paralympic Games took place on September 7, at the Beijing National Aquatics Center.

Two heats were held, with six swimmers in the first heat and seven swimmers in the second heat. The swimmers with the eight fastest times advanced to the final; there, they all competed in a single final heat to earn final placements.

Heats

Heat 1

Heat 2

Final

References

Swimming at the 2008 Summer Paralympics